Adamabad-e Baluchi Now (also Romanized as Ādamābād-e Balūchī Now; also known as Ādamābād) is a village in Polan Rural District, Polan District, Chabahar County, Sistan and Baluchestan Province, Iran. At the 2006 census, its population was 178, in 32 families.

References 

Populated places in Chabahar County